Sultantepe may refer to:

 Sultantepe
 Sultantepe, Istanbul
 Sultantepe, Kayapınar
 Sultantepe, Üsküdar